Lina Abu Akleh is a Palestinian-Armenian human rights advocate who was named as one of the BBC's 100 Women in 2022. She was also listed as one of the TIME100 Next List for 2022. Her inclusion on the TIME100 list was as a result of her "publicly demanding scrutiny of Israel's treatment of Palestinians". As the niece of Shireen Abu Akleh, a journalist shot dead by Israeli forces in 2022, Lina Abu Akleh has campaigned for justice for her aunt, and for issues affecting Palestinians more generally. This has included petitioning the United States Government to open its own investigation into the death of her aunt, as well as meeting Secretary of State Antony Blinken. In October 2022 she met with Pope Francis at a memorial mass for her aunt.

Abu Akleh grew up in Jerusalem; her father is Palestinian and her mother is Armenian. She has a BA in Political Studies from the American University of Beirut. Her MA is in International Studies and was awarded by the University of San Francisco.

References

External links 

 UN Human Rights Council: Testimony by Lina Abu Akleh, niece of Shireen Abu Akleh
 MA thesis: The Slow Creep of Settler Colonialism: Exploring Water Control in Palestine

Living people
Year of birth missing (living people)
People from Jerusalem
20th-century Palestinian women
21st-century Palestinian women
Women human rights activists
Palestinian human rights activists
American University of Beirut alumni
University of San Francisco alumni
Armenian diaspora in Israel